Conca della Campania is a comune (municipality) in the Province of Caserta in the Italian region Campania, located about  northwest of Naples and about  northwest of Caserta.

Conca della Campania borders the following municipalities: Galluccio, Marzano Appio, Mignano Monte Lungo, Presenzano, Roccamonfina, Tora e Piccilli.

References

External links
Association Proloco of Conca della Campania

Cities and towns in Campania